The First cabinet of Jón Magnússon was formed 4 January 1917.

Cabinets

Inaugural cabinet

Change (28 August 1917)

See also 

1917 establishments in Iceland
1920 disestablishments in Iceland
Jon Magnusson, First cabinet of
Cabinets established in 1917
Cabinets disestablished in 1920
Progressive Party (Iceland)